Samuel Gledhill (7 July 1913 – December 1994) was an English footballer.

1913 births
Sportspeople from Castleford
1994 deaths
English footballers
Association football midfielders
York City F.C. players